Laurus International School of Science is a co-ed pre-school, kindergarten and international school based in Tokyo. Laurus takes students from Japan and the international community in the Tokyo area. The headquarters are based in Shirokanedai. Laurus follows the Cambridge International curriculum and science, art, music and physical education (PE).

History 
Laurus International opened its  first school in 2002 (as Bilinga ) to provide instruction in English from pre-school to Kindergarten (K3). The school was initially created to offer a more global choice of education than available through the national education system in Japan, often seen as lecture based and less than progressive. 
The school places emphasis on science as a means to encourage students to inquire about the world around them.

Pre-school through to kindergarten 
Bilinga then changed its name to Laurus International School of Science and as of August 2017 was Tokyo's largest Pre-School / Kindergarten group with eight schools in the Tokyo area. In 2016 Laurus became a member of TAIP (Tokyo Association of Preschools). Laurus follows the model of a Japanese kindergarten. Japanese Kindergartens are referred to as a Yochien in Japan. They provide education for students who are aged 3–6. Students go through 3 years of instruction as K1 (age 3,4) K2 (age 4,5) and K3 (age 5,6). Japanese kindergartens follow educational aims, while preschools are predominantly daycare facilities, concerned with providing care for infants and toddlers.

Elementary school 
Mr and Ms. Hioki  opened the elementary school (now Laurus International School of Science ) in 2015 and now accepts students from its own K–3 classes and schools as well as other schools both in Japan and abroad. Laurus International School is Tokyo's first STEM school. It offers a robust interdisciplinary STEM program, where lessons include programming and frequent hands-on activities. The school is currently seeking accreditation with Cambridge International Examinations which accredits over 10 000 schools in 160 countries.
The school includes programming and ICT classes which complements the core Cambridge curriculum. Computer and keyboard skills form a part of the ICT basis. Some of the curriculum utilizes paid and free software – for example typing.com to assist with computer literacy. The school hosts an annual science fair.

Locations 
Laurus International School has 6 main schools in its Shirokanedai, Den-en-chofu, Takanawa, Aoyama, Musashikosugi and Musashishinjo locations – mostly in the Tokyo Metropolitan area, with 2 smaller schools in Nishimagome and Kugahara.

Curriculum 
Laurus International School uses a combination of well established English language text books, its own curriculum developed in-house and the Cambridge International Examinations curriculum. The key focus areas of literacy and numeracy which is indispensable for an educational foundation.

See also

References 

Elementary schools in Japan
Schools in Tokyo
International schools in Japan